The 1982 1. divisjon was the 38th completed season of top division football in Norway.

Overview
22 games were played with 2 points given for wins and 1 for draws. Number eleven and twelve were relegated. The winners of the two groups of the 2. divisjon were promoted, as well as the winner of a series of play-off matches between number ten in the First Division and the two second-placed teams in the two groups of the 2. divisjon. 

Viking won the championship, their seventh title.

Teams and locations
''Note: Table lists in alphabetical order.

League table

Results

Relegation play-offs
The qualification play-off matches were contested between Fredrikstad (10th in the 1. divisjon), Eik (2nd in the 2. divisjon - Group A), and Steinkjer (2nd in the 2. divisjon - Group B). Eik won both their games and were promoted to the 1. divisjon.

Results
 Fredrikstad 2–3 Eik
 Steinkjer 1–3 Fredrikstad
 Eik 2–1 Steinkjer

Season statistics

Top scorers
 Tor Arne Granerud, Hamarkameratene – 11 goals
 Trygve Johannessen, Viking – 11 goals

Attendances

References

Norway - List of final tables (RSSSF)
Norsk internasjonal fotballstatistikk (NIFS)

Eliteserien seasons
Norway
Norway
1